{{Infobox writer 
| name         = Ha Jin
| image        = Ha jin 8693.jpg
| imagesize    = 
| caption      = 
| original     = 
| kana         = 
| romaji       =   
| zi           = 
| hao          = 
| birth_name = 
| pseudonym    = Ha Jin
| birth_date =  
| birth_place = Liaoning, China
| residence    =
| occupation   = 
| nationality  = American
| citizenship  = 
| education    = Doctor of Philosophy
| alma_mater   = Heilongjiang UniversityShandong UniversityBrandeis University
| period       = 
| genre        = Poetry, short story, novel, essay
| subjects = China
| movement     = 
| notableworks = {{collapsible list
  |titlestyle = 
  |title =
  |liststyle = 
  |The Boat Rocker|Waiting|In the Pond|War Trash|Ocean of Words|The Bridegroom}}
| parents      =
| spouse       = 
| partner      = 
| children     = 
| relatives    = 
| awards       = 
| signature    = Ha Jin Signature.png
| website      = 
}}

Jin Xuefei (born February 21, 1956) is a Chinese-American poet and novelist using the pen name Ha Jin. Ha comes from his favorite city, Harbin. His poetry is associated with the Misty Poetry movement.

Early life
Ha Jin was born in Liaoning, China. His father was a military officer; at thirteen, Jin joined the People's Liberation Army during the Cultural Revolution. Jin began to educate himself in Chinese literature and high school curriculum at sixteen. He left the army when he was nineteen, as he entered Heilongjiang University and earned a bachelor's degree in English studies. This was followed by a master's degree in Anglo-American literature at Shandong University.

Jin grew up in the chaos of early communist China.  He was on a scholarship at Brandeis University when the 1989 Tiananmen Square protests and massacre occurred. The Chinese government's forcible crackdown hastened his decision to emigrate to the United States, and was the cause of his choice to write in English "to preserve the integrity of his work." He eventually obtained a Ph.D. One of his mentors was literary critic Eugene Goodheart.

Career
Jin sets many of his stories and novels in China, in the fictional Muji City. He has won the National Book Award for Fiction and the PEN/Faulkner Award for his novel, Waiting (1999). He has received three Pushcart Prizes for fiction and a Kenyon Review Prize. Many of his short stories have appeared in The Best American Short Stories anthologies.  His collection Under The Red Flag (1997) won the Flannery O'Connor Award for Short Fiction, while Ocean of Words (1996) has been awarded the PEN/Hemingway Award. The novel War Trash (2004), set during the Korean War, won a second PEN/Faulkner Award for Jin, thus ranking him with Philip Roth, John Edgar Wideman and E. L. Doctorow who are the only other authors to have won the prize more than once. War Trash was also a finalist for the Pulitzer Prize.

Jin currently teaches at Boston University in Boston, Massachusetts. He formerly taught at Emory University in Atlanta, Georgia.

Jin was a Mary Ellen von der Heyden Fellow for Fiction at the American Academy in Berlin, Germany, in the fall of 2008. He was inducted to the American Academy of Arts and Letters in 2014.

On July 28, 2021, an asteroid was named after him: (58495) Hajin.

Awards and honors
Flannery O'Connor Award for Short Fiction (1996)
Hemingway Foundation/PEN Award (1997)
Guggenheim Fellowship (1999)
National Book Award (1999)
PEN/Faulkner Award (2000)
Asian Fellowship (2000–2002)
Townsend Prize for Fiction (2002)
PEN/Faulkner Award (2005)
Fellow of American Academy of Arts and Sciences (2006)
Dayton Literary Peace Prize, runner-up, Nanjing Requiem (2012)
 PEN Oakland Josephine Miles Literary Award for A Distant Center (2019)

Books

Poetry
 Between Silences (1990)
 Facing Shadows (1996)
 Ways of Talking (1996)
 Wreckage (2001)
 Missed Time The Past A Distant Center (2018, Copper Canyon Press)

Short story collections
 Ocean of Words (1996)
 Under the Red Flag (1997)
 The Bridegroom (2000)
 A Good Fall (2009)

Novels
 In the Pond (1998)
 Waiting (1999)
 The Crazed (2002)
 War Trash (2004)
 A Free Life (2007)
 Nanjing Requiem (2011)
 A Map of Betrayal (2014)
 The Boat Rocker (2016)
 A Song Everlasting (2021)

Biographies
 The Banished Immortal (2019)

Essays
 The Writer as Migrant (2008)

See also

 Saboteur (short story) (2000)

References

 John Noell Moore, "The Landscape Of Divorce When Worlds Collide," The English Journal 92 (Nov. 2002), pp. 124–127.
 Ha Jin, Waiting (New York: Pantheon Books, 1999).
 Neil J Diamant, Revolutionizing the Family: Politics, Love and Divorce in Urban and Rural China, 1949-1968(Berkeley and Los Angeles: University of California Press, 2000), p. 59.
 Ha Jin, The Bridegroom'' (New York: Pantheon Books, 2000).
 Yuejin Wang, Chinese Literature: Essays, Articles, Reviews 13 (Dec. 1991).
 Ha Jin, "Exiled to English" (New York Times, May 30, 2009).

External links

Listen to Ha Jin on The Forum from the BBC World Service
Boston University staff page
Author interview in Guernica Magazine (guernicamag.com)
Ha Jin audio interview re: A Free Life, November 2007
Exiled to English
Audio: Ha Jin in conversation on the BBC World Service discussion programme The Forum
"Ha Jin's Cultural Revolution" - New York Times Magazine profile (2000).
 Ha Jin at Library of Congress Authorities — with 20 catalog records

1956 births
Living people
20th-century American novelists
20th-century American poets
21st-century American novelists
21st-century American poets
American male novelists
American male poets
American male short story writers
American novelists of Chinese descent
American short story writers of Chinese descent
Boston University faculty
Brandeis University alumni
Chinese emigrants to the United States
Chinese male novelists
Emory University faculty
Exophonic writers
Flannery O'Connor Award for Short Fiction winners
National Book Award winners
PEN/Faulkner Award for Fiction winners
Hemingway Foundation/PEN Award winners
Postmodern writers
Misty poets
Shandong University alumni
Heilongjiang University alumni
Educators from Liaoning
Poets from Liaoning
Writers from Liaoning
Novelists from Massachusetts
Novelists from Georgia (U.S. state)
20th-century American male writers
21st-century American male writers
Members of the American Academy of Arts and Letters